In the early 1900s Sister Laura Marian Smith, a nurse at the Glasgow Royal Maternity Hospital, noted the high levels of malnutrition in children at the time, and is credited with promoting the use of a Casein inhibitor to make cows milk more beneficial to those who had extreme difficulty in digesting it. By creating a powder formulae to mix with milk, it enabled it to become an effective aid to patient recovery. Although named after Sister Laura - this was a marketing strategy as the powder is said to have been developed by Dr Leonard Findlay, at the time a noted expert of infant dietary disorders at Rottenrow. Although Sister Laura was one of the original shareholders when the company when it was established in 1911, by 1920 she had sold her interests in the company, though it continued to expand, opening a purpose-built factory at Emerson Road West, Bishopbriggs. 

The new factory at Springfield Works (Emerson Road West) heralded the incorporation of a new company, Sister Lauras Infant and Invalid Food Co Ltd was now controlled by William and Edward Watson, and it expanded rapidly acquiring other well-established products, notably Teddylax and Zomogen, the latter being used as a treatment of anaemia and neurasthenia. The Sister Laura Co then took its first steps by expanding Internationally, with the purchase of Irish company H J Wade & Co.  Continuing to service the wholesale chemist and pharmacy sector, in 1957 with declining sales of its core product (malnutrition being practically unknown due to the arrival of the NHS in 1948), it purchased a patent for 'improvements relating to quick cooking cereal or farinaceous products' from Mr. Hans Knoch, commencing manufacture of 'Easyrice' at Springfield Works. However, with consumer choice becoming more sophisticated, within ten years Sister Lauras found itself unable to return to its earlier profitability, and closed in 1981

Dietary supplements